Surcouf is a 1924 French silent adventure film serial directed by Luitz-Morat and starring Jean Angelo, María Dalbaicín and Thomy Bourdelle. It is loosely based on the life of the eighteenth century privateer Robert Surcouf.
Its initial release date was 13 February 1925.
The film's sets were designed by the art director Louis Nalpas.

Main cast
 Jean Angelo as Robert Surcouf 
 María Dalbaicín as Madiana 
 Thomy Bourdelle as Marcof 
 Pierre Hot as Dutertre 
 Jacqueline Blanc as Marie-Catherine 
 Johanna Sutter as Tagore 
 Antonin Artaud as Jacques Morel, un traitre 
 Louis Monfils as Commodore Rewington 
 Daniel Mendaille as Bruce 
 Émilie Prévost as Madame Surcouf 
 Émile Keppens as Le père Surcouf 
 Georgette Sorelle as Lady Bruce 
 Jean Peyrière as William Pitt

See also
 The Sea Pirate (1966)

References

Bibliography
 Klossner, Michael. The Europe of 1500-1815 on Film and Television: A Worldwide Filmography of Over 2550 Works, 1895 Through 2000. McFarland & Company, 2002.

External links

1925 films
Films directed by Luitz-Morat
French silent films
French black-and-white films
French historical adventure films
Seafaring films
1920s historical adventure films
Films set in the 18th century
Film serials
Pathé films
1920s French films
1920s French-language films
Silent historical adventure films